Debbie, is a 1965 South African drama film directed by Elmo De Witt and produced by Jamie Uys for Jamie Uys Filmproduksies. The film stars Suzanne van Oudtshoorn in lead role along with Leon le Roux, Gert van den Bergh and Dawid van der Walt in supportive roles.

The film revolves around a teen girl Debbie Malan who went to the town and become pregnant out of wedlock. The film received positive reviews and won several awards at international film festivals.

Plot
 Suzanne van Oudtshoorn as Debbie Malan
 Leon le Roux as Paul Hugo
 Gert van den Bergh as Dr. Chris Hugo
 Dawie van der Walt as Pieter le Grange
 Beryl Gresak as Tina Hugo
 Mynhardt Siegfried Mynhardt as Mr. Malan
 Hettie Uys as Mrs. Malan
 Emsie Botha as Trudi
 Sann de Lange as Hester Schoombie
 Cobus Rossouw as Bennie
 Wena Naudé as Woman in church
 Cathy Meyers		
 Johan du Plooy as Magistrate's assistant
 June Neethling as Adoptive mother
 Vonk de Ridder as Johan
 Frances Fuchs as Debbie's aunt
 Robert van Tonder		
 Deanne de Witt as Debbie and Paul's daughter

References

External links
 
 Debbie on YouTube

1965 films
1965 drama films
South African drama films